Claudio Burlando (born 27 April 1954, in Genoa) is an Italian politician, and was President of Liguria, until 31 March 2015. He is a member of the Democratic Party, and a former Democrats of the Left member.

Career
After graduating with a degree in electronic engineering, in the eighties he worked as a researcher for the company Elsag-Bailey. He became interested in politics from a young age, adhering to the Italian Communist Party with which he took his first steps in politics and he held the first public office, becoming secretary of the federation Genoese party from 1989 to 1990.

He later joined the Democratic Party of the Left, with which he was elected to Parliament and has held the position of national coordinator of local authorities (1994-1996) and the Democrats of the Left, of which he was chief economist from 1998 to 2000. With the Communist Party, he became councilor (1981-1993) and Commissioner for Transport (1983-1985). He was deputy mayor of Genoa (1990-1992, during the tenure of Romano Merlo) From 3 December 1992 to 19 May 1993 was Mayor of Genoa.

In 1996 he was elected Member of the PDS and in the same year, appointed by Romano Prodi as Minister of Transport and Navigation. Two years after, Massimo D'Alema appointed him a member of the budget committee of the Chamber of Deputies.

On 14 October 2007 he was elected to the Constituent National Democratic Party, a political project in which he personally participated since its first design and was a member of the committee that drafted the Manifesto of Values.

References

External links
 Official website
 Profile at Italian Chamber of Deputies

1954 births
Living people
Presidents of Liguria
Transport ministers of Italy
Mayors of Genoa
Democratic Party (Italy) politicians
21st-century Italian politicians
Politics of Liguria